Jayden Brailey (born 9 April 1996) is an Australian professional rugby league footballer who plays as a hooker for the Newcastle Knights in the NRL.

He previously played for the Cronulla-Sutherland Sharks in the National Rugby League.

Background
Brailey was born in Hurstville, New South Wales, Australia. He is of English descent.

He played his junior football for the Aquinas Colts and attended Aquinas College, Menai. In 2014, Brailey played for the Australian Schoolboys. In 2015 and 2016, Brailey played for the Sharks NYC team. On 4 September 2016, Brailey was awarded as the 2016 Holden Cup Player of the Year.

Playing career

2017
After the retirement of Michael Ennis after the Sharks' historical 2016 NRL Grand Final win against the Melbourne Storm, Brailey earned the job of hooker ahead of new recruits, Daniel Mortimer and Manaia Cherrington. He made his debut for the Sharks in the World Club Challenge match against the Wigan Warriors. On 2 March, Brailey made his first appearance in the  NRL against the Brisbane Broncos. In Round 16 against Manly, Brailey suffered a broken jaw after attempting to tackle Manly player Dylan Walker. He was ruled out for two months and returned for in round 24.

2018
Brailey made 26 appearances for Cronulla in 2018 as the club fell one game short of another grand final appearance losing to Melbourne in the preliminary final.

2019
In July, Brailey signed a three-year contract with the Newcastle Knights starting in 2020, after being granted a release from the final year of his Cronulla contract.

Brailey made a total of 24 appearances for Cronulla in the 2019 NRL season as the club finished in 7th spot on the table and qualified for the finals.  Brailey's final game for Cronulla came in the elimination final against Manly which Cronulla lost 28–16 at Brookvale Oval.

2020
In March, Brailey was ruled out for the remainder of the 2020 NRL season after rupturing his anterior cruciate ligament against the Wests Tigers in round 2 of the competition.

2021
For round 1 of the 2021 NRL season, Brailey was announced as a Knights co-captain alongside Daniel Saifiti.
Brailey played 23 games for Newcastle in the 2021 NRL season including the club's elimination finals loss against Parramatta.

References

External links

Newcastle Knigths profile
Cronulla Sharks profile
NRL profile

1996 births
Australian rugby league players
Australian people of English descent
Cronulla-Sutherland Sharks players
Newcastle Knights players
Newcastle Knights captains
Rugby league hookers
Living people
Rugby league players from Sydney